Baruya may refer to:
Baruya people, a tribe in the highlands of Papua New Guinea
Baruya language, a variety of the Yipma language